Lisa Fjeldstad Naalsund (born 11 June 1995) is a Norwegian professional footballer who plays as a midfielder for Manchester United of the English Women's Super League and the Norway national team.

Club career

Arna-Bjørnar
Naalsund began playing football at the age of 6 for local club Tertnes. She also played handball until secondary school. Ahead of the 2012 season, she joined Arna-Bjørnar. On 14 April 2012, Naalsund made her senior debut for the club when she started the season opener, a 1–1 draw with Røa IL. She played 67 minutes before being substituted for fellow offseason arrival Vilde Bøe Risa, also making her senior debut. She scored her first senior goal on 9 June 2012 during a 2–0 win over Klepp IL. In her first season with the club, Naalsund played in all 22 Toppserien matches including 18 starts and scored four goals. During her first three seasons, Naalsund played in all but one league match as Arna-Bjørnar finished third in all three seasons, equalling the team's record highest finish position. In seven years, Naalsund was a mainstay of Arna-Bjørnar and made 157 appearances in all competitions.

Sandviken/Brann
Ahead of the 2019 season, Naalsund signed for Sandviken (rebranded 
Brann in 2022). In 2020, Naalsund made 18 league appearances as she was named to the Toppserien Team of the Year. Having previously recorded a team-record best 4th-place finish the previous three seasons in a row, Sandviken won the 2021 Toppserien league title for the first time. Naalsund was once again named to the team of the season having made 18 appearances and scored five goals. In 2022, the team defended their league title and also won the Norwegian Women's Cup for the first time.

Manchester United
On 24 January 2023, Naalsund signed for English Women's Super League club Manchester United on a three-and-a-half year contract. Having joined while working through fitness issues, Naalsund had to wait until 19 March 2023 to make her debut, starting in an FA Cup quarter-final against second division team Lewes. She started the game but was substituted off after 25 minutes with a hamstring problem.

International career

Youth
Naalsund first represented Norway at under-15 level in 2010. She continued to progress as a youth international, participating in 2012 UEFA Women's Under-17 Championship qualification and attended her first tournament finals stage at the 2013 UEFA Women's Under-19 Championship. The following year she was recalled to the squad as Norway hosted the 2014 UEFA Women's Under-19 Championship.

Senior
In November 2017, Naalsund received her first senior international call-up for Norway for a friendly against Canada but was an unused substitute.

Having yet to be capped, Naalsund was named as an injury replacement for Emilie Haavi for the 2019 FIFA Women's World Cup. However, due to squad regulations, Naalsund could not be registered and had to remain a training player ineligible to play in the tournament.

Naalsund made her senior international debut for the Norway on 10 June 2021, coming on as a 80th-minute substitute for Vilde Bøe Risa in a frinedly 1–0 loss against Sweden.

On 7 June 2022, Naalsund was named to the squad for UEFA Women's Euro 2022. However, she suffered a leg injury during a pre-tournament friendly against New Zealand on 25 June and was replaced by Thea Bjelde.

Career statistics

Club

International

Honours
Sandviken/Brann
Toppserien: 2021, 2022
Norwegian Women's Cup: 2022

Individual
Toppserien Team of the Year: 2020, 2021

References

1995 births
Living people
Footballers from Bergen
Women's association football midfielders
Norwegian women's footballers
Norway women's youth international footballers
Norway women's international footballers
Arna-Bjørnar players
SK Brann Kvinner players
Manchester United W.F.C. players
Toppserien players
Women's Super League players
Norwegian expatriate women's footballers
Expatriate women's footballers in England
Norwegian expatriate sportspeople in England